Brosmophycini is a tribe of viviparous brotula, one of two tribes in the subfamily Brosmophycinae. They are distinguished from the other brosmophycin tribe, the Dinematichthyini, by having a male intromittent organ which has no ossified parts, a scale-covered body and well developed gill rakers.

Genera
The following genera are classified as being members of the tribe Brosmophycini:

 Bidenichthys
 Brosmodorsalis
 Brosmophyciops
 Brosmophycis
 Eusurculus
 Fiordichthys
 Lucifuga
 Melodichthys

References

Bythitidae
Taxa named by Theodore Gill